Plantesamfund - Grundtræk af den økologiske Plantegeografi, published in Danish in 1895 by Eugen Warming, and in English in 1909 as Oecology of Plants: An Introduction to the Study of Plant Communities, by Warming and Martin Vahl, was the first book to be published having the word ecology in its title. The book has had a lasting impact on the field of ecology, particularly in its German translation soon after its initial publication, and in its expanded and revised English translation.

The book was based on Warming's lectures on plant geography at the University of Copenhagen. It gives an introduction to all major biomes of the world. Its aim was to explain how nature solved similar problems (drought, flooding, cold, salt, herbivory) in similar way, despite using very different raw material (species of different descent) in different regions of the world.

 Warming, E. (1895) Plantesamfund - Grundtræk af den økologiske Plantegeografi. P.G. Philipsens Forlag, Kjøbenhavn. 335 pp.

Translated editions
The book was translated to German in 1896 as 
 Lehrbuch der ökologischen Pflanzengeographie - Eine Einführung in die Kenntnis der Pflanzenverenie by Emil Knoblauch. Berlin, Gebrüder Borntraeger, 1896. 412 pp.
This edition, which was approved by Warming, rapidly ran out of print. A second, unauthorized, edition was issued in 1902 by Paul Graebner, who put his own name after Warming's on the book's frontispiece, despite no changes to the contents. This edition was expanded in third and fourth editions:
 Warming, E. & Graebner, P. (1918) Eug. Warming's Lehrbuch der ökologischen Pflanzengeographie, 3 ed. Berlin, Gebrüder Borntrager. Fourth edn (1933) - 1158 pp.

A Polish translation of ’Plantesamfund’ (from Knoblauch's German translation) appeared in 1900:
 Warming, E. (1900) Zbiorowiska Roślinne zarys ekologicznej geografii roślin by Edward Strumpf and Jósef Trzebiński. Warszawa, 1900.  451 pp.
Two independent Russian (Moscow and St. Petersburg) editions appeared in 1901 and 1903
 Вармингъ, Е. (1901) Ойкологическая географія растеній – Введеніе въ изученіе растительныхъ сообществъ by M. Golenkin and W. Arnol'di. Moskva, 542 pp. Full text link 

 Вармингъ, Е. (1903) Распредъленіе растений въ зависимости отъ внъшнихъ условій - Экологическая географія растеній by A. G. Henkel' and with a treatise of the vegetation of Russia by G. I. Tanfil'ev. St. Petersburg, 474 pp.
An extended and translated edition in English first appeared in 1909:
 Warming, E. with M. Vahl (1909) Oecology of Plants - an introduction to the study of plant-communities by P. Groom and I. B. Balfour. Clarendon Press, Oxford. 422 pp. (2nd edn 1925). Reprinted a number of times, most recently by Biotech Books, Delhi 
It is unknown why an English translation only appeared fourteen years after the Danish original. In Warming's private correspondence, he mentions to have received a letter from "a professor from Belleville, Illinois, who wishes to translate Plantesamfund" (May 1898, letter to his son Jens).

The impact of Plantesamfund
It was Eugenius Warming's Lehrbuch der ökologischen Pflanzengeographie that must be considered as the starting point of self-conscious ecology. This book was the first to use physiological relations between plants and their environment, and in addition biotic interactions to explain the moulding of the assemblages that plant geographers had described and classified, and it would set up a research agenda for decades to come.

Despite the language barrier, Warming's influence on the development of ecology is remarkable, not the least in Britain and the USA. The British ecologist Arthur Tansley was extremely influenced by reading ’Plantesamfund’ (or rather the 1896 German edition). Reading the book made him jump from anatomy to ecology.

The German translation was widely read in England and America and played an important part in stimulating fieldwork in both, countries. It certainly did in my own case: I well remember working through it with enthusiasm in 1898 and going out into the field to see how far one could match the plant communities Warming had described for Denmark in the English countryside; and I also made the book the basis of a course of University Extension lectures at Toynbee Hall in 1899.

Similarly, Warming's book impregnated North American naturalists like Henry Chandler Cowles and Frederic Clements. Cowles appear to have been completely taken: 
Charles J. Chamberlain, who attended Coulter's lectures as a student and later joined the University of Chicago faculty, recalled in a memoir that ‘none of us could read Danish except a Danish student, who would translate a couple of chapters, and the next day Coulter would give a wonderful lecture on Ecology ... Cowles, with his superior knowledge of taxonomy and geology, understood more than the rest of us, and became so interested that he studied Danish and, long before any translation appeared, could read the book in the original ... The treatment of such sand dunes as Warming knew, started Henry on his study of the comparatively immense moving dunes south of the University.

Schimper's Pflanzengeographie auf physiologisher Grundlage
The German ecologist A.F.W. Schimper published Pflanzengeographie auf physiologisher Grundlage in 1898 (in English 1903 as Plant-geography upon a physiological basis translated by W.R. Fischer, Oxford: Clarendon press, 839 pp.). Some authors have contended that part of the book was a case of plagiarism with heavy unacknowledged borrowing from Plantesamfund.
"This work not only covered much of the same ground as Warming did in 1895 and 1896 but in fact also leaned heavily on Warming's research. Schimper (1898) quoted extensively from more than fifteen of Warming’s works and even reproduced Warming’s figures. Yet nowhere did Schimper acknowledge his profound debt to Warming, neither in the list of picture credits, nor in the acknowledgements section of the Vorwort, nor in his list of major sources, and not even in a footnote! ... Although replete with Warming's data, it contains few ideas and did not advance ecology beyond what Warming had done earlier.” 
Schimper's book is organized in three parts, (1) The factors, (2) Formations and mutualisms, and (3) Zones and regions. The third part is by far the largest (more than 3/4). It contains subsections on the Tropics, the Temperate zone, The Arctic, the Alpine regions and the Aquatic environments. This section is organized in a rather traditional way (leaning on de Candolle and others), but is full of Schimper's original observations from his travels throughout the World. The first part is organized in chapters about water, temperature, light, air, soil and animals, i.e. following the overall organization of Plantesamfund. The second part has chapters on plant communities under particular environmental control and about lianas, epiphytes and parasites. Schimper lists the literature used after each chapter and, for the chapters in the first two parts, Warming’s Lehrbuch der ökologischen Pflanzengeographie (Plantesamfund in the 1896 German translation) is included in every case. Yet, despite leaning heavily on this work with regard to both structure, content and illustrations of parts one and two, Schimper does not include Warming in his acknowledgements in the foreword (43 named individuals are thanked) nor does he include Plantesamfund in the short list of highly recommended readings at the end of the foreword (de Candolle’s Géographie botanique raisonnée (1855), Grisebach’s Die Vegetation der Erde (1872), Drude’s Handbuch der Pflanzengeographie (1890) and Atlas der Pflanzenverbreitung (1887) and Engler’s Versuch einen Entwicklungsgeschickte der Pflanzenwelt (1879-1882)). Taken together it clearly gives the impression that Schimper has been suspiciously economic with acknowledgements of his great intellectual debts to Warming.

Contents

The text on growth forms was written anew by Warming for 'Oecology of Plants'

New conceptual terms
In ‘Plantesamfund’, Warming coined the words hydrophyte, mesophyte, xerophyte and halophyte.
 Hydrophyte - An aquatic plant; a plant which lives and grows in water.
 Mesophyte - A name given to plants which grow naturally in conditions of intermediate soil moisture.
 Xerophyte - A plant that is able to grow where the water supply is small. Xerophytes are plants that are able to control the loss of water from their aërial parts. Xerophytes employ many different tools to control the loss of water, such as; waxy deposits, varnish, or mineral crusts on the epidermis; reduction of air spaces; storage organs; thick-walled epidermis; and cork in woody plants. Some xerophytes are annual plants that grow quickly during the rainy season.
 Halophyte - A plant which grows in salt-impregnated soils.

References

 

1895 non-fiction books
Ecology books
Botany books
1895 in biology